Gerd Gradwohl (born 16 January 1960 in Kempten) is a visually impaired alpine skier from Germany. He won a gold medal and a bronze medal in Alpine skiing at the 2006 Winter Paralympics. He was disqualified for a gold medal due to a rules violation concerning distance from his guide

References

External links
 

1960 births
Living people
Paralympic alpine skiers of Germany
Alpine skiers at the 2006 Winter Paralympics
Paralympic gold medalists for Germany
Paralympic bronze medalists for Germany
Visually impaired category Paralympic competitors
Medalists at the 2006 Winter Paralympics
German male alpine skiers
Paralympic medalists in alpine skiing
21st-century German people